Live KST, Akademija is a live album and the debut release by the Serbian alternative rock band Block Out, released in 1993. The album was released only on compact cassette, and was never rereleased on compact disc.

Track listing

Akademija (Side A) 
 "Kiša" (3:22)
 "Sanjaj me" (3:07)
 "Ljubičasto" (2:24)
 "Pijana noć" (3:43)
 "Boje" (3:14)
 "Daj mi svoju ljubav" (4:07)
 "Ja znam" (5:55)

KST (Side B) 
 "Kiša" (5:18)
 "Ona stalno razmišlja" (8:11)
 "Život" (6:26)
 "Neki moji drugovi" (9:28)

External links 
 EX YU ROCK enciklopedija 1960-2006, Janjatović Petar; 
 Live KST, Akademija at Discogs

References 

Block Out (band) live albums
1993 live albums